is a 3D augmented reality shooter video game developed by HAL Laboratory and published by Nintendo. It was released as preloaded software on all systems in the Nintendo 3DS line of hardware, and was first released in 2011.

Gameplay 
Face Raiders is a single player, augmented reality, shooter game that uses the handheld's gyroscopic controls and cameras. It was first released with the Nintendo 3DS and has been preloaded on all devices in the family. The game is an extended tech demo with a total of two modes and nine levels. Six of these are the primary experience for players, with the three stages in the secondary mode designed to be shown to friends unfamiliar with the game. After taking pictures of people's faces, the game uses the faces to create enemies that attack the player, who must shoot them. The background of the game is the rear camera's viewpoint, which enemies will break through and hide behind. As people walk by in the background, the game takes their pictures, adding to the faces the player must shoot, and adding to the player's score. There are also combos for repeating an action, which multiply the score every time (e.g. if the player hits enemies in the mouth continuously). There are butterflies which can be hit in order to refill health and bombs to collect to be used to destroy all enemies on the screen. At the end of each stage, the player battles a boss. When the boss is defeated, its helmet will transform into an afro. Local high scores are record on a leaderboard. By pressing Y on level select screen the player can hear some advice, and the player can turn on surprise snaps which take photos for you on levels.

Development 
The game was developed by HAL Laboratory alongside other built in software for the Nintendo 3DS. The team wanted to create a game that would interest people who had played the training software. The idea for the game started with using the faces of the player and others to create a comedic experience. HAL first started building prototypes using the face montage and other filters you could apply to photos, which ended up being included as a way to attack enemies. The merge lens was popular among developers, where two faces would be combined which ended up being part of the final game.  At the end of development, HAL added a feature where you could point the outer camera of the 3DS at someone, and their face would become an enemy in the game. The game's AR features were created with the Nintendo 3DS Camera Team.

Reception 
Prior to release with the 3DS, Face Raiders received generally positive feedback when it was shown at E3 as a tech demo with blocks instead of faces. When the use of faces was included, reviews were even more positive, with reviewers enjoying the fun and humor created by using faces and a live background. The point-and-shoot gameplay with gyroscopic controls was said to be novel and easy to use. The free price was also cited as a positive aspect of the game, though some noted that it would be worth an eShop purchase if it had instead been offered there. The varied tactics to defeat enemies and bosses were applauded. However, the shortness of the game was also cited as a downside. Reviewers also felt that the 3D effect could be compromised by using the motion controls. The game was also seen as a good way to showcase the features of the 3DS to unfamiliar audiences.

References 

2011 video games
Nintendo 3DS games
Nintendo 3DS-only games
HAL Laboratory games
Nintendo games
Video games developed in Japan
Shooter video games
Video games scored by Shogo Sakai